Epic (also known as Epic: Days of the Dinosaur) is a 1984 Australian animated feature by Yoram Gross, who later called it "a rather Australian film – I can't say very successful, a little bit too much experimental film, too much abstract story."

Storyline
During a massive flood, two children are rescued by a family of dingoes, which subsequently raises them as their own. When the children come of age, they must go out into the world and collect the "secrets of life", before becoming the new king and queen of the dingoes.

Voice cast
John Huston – Narrator (US Version)
Ross Higgins
Robyn Moore
Benita Collings – Narrator (Australian Version)
Keith Scott

References

External links
 
Epic at Oz Movies

1984 films
Films directed by Yoram Gross
Australian animated feature films
1984 animated films
Films scored by Guy Gross
1980s Australian animated films
1980s English-language films
1980s Australian films
Flying Bark Productions films